Snow Canyon High School (SCHS) is a public high school in St. George, Utah, United States. It is part of the Washington County School District. Zone: west St. George, Santa Clara and Ivins. As of January 2019, it serves 1,165 students making it the fourth largest high school in St. George and in the district.

Athletics 
The school competes in the 4A division in region 9 with other Washington County schools and two high schools from Cedar City, Utah. Snow Canyon will remain in 4A Region 9 for the 2019–2021 classification period.

References

External links 
 

Buildings and structures in St. George, Utah
Schools in Washington County, Utah
Public high schools in Utah